Chase Brook may refer to: 

 Chase Brook (Minnesota)
 Chase Brook (West Branch Delaware River), in New York